Francis Patrick Ferran (died 10 June 1923) was an Irish Sinn Féin politician and medical practitioner. He was elected unopposed as a Sinn Féin Teachta Dála (TD) to the 2nd Dáil at the 1921 elections for the Sligo–Mayo East constituency. He opposed the Anglo-Irish Treaty and voted against it. He was elected as an anti-Treaty Sinn Féin TD at the 1922 general election but did not take his seat. He died while imprisoned by the pro-Treaty government during the Irish Civil War at the Curragh Camp in 1923.

References

External links

Year of birth missing
1923 deaths
Early Sinn Féin TDs
Members of the 2nd Dáil
Members of the 3rd Dáil
Alumni of Queen's University Belfast